Pettigrew, also spelt Pettigru, may refer to:

People
 Andrew Pettigrew (born 1944), British academic
 Antonio Pettigrew (1967–2010), American sprinter
 Belle L. Pettigrew (1839–1912), American educator, missionary
 Brandon Pettigrew (born 1985), American football player
 Damian Pettigrew, Canadian filmmaker
 Eric Pettigrew, American politician
 J. Johnston Pettigrew (1828–1863), American general 
 Jack Pettigrew (born 1943), Australian neuroscientist 
 James Bell Pettigrew (1832–1908), Scottish naturalist and museum curator
 James L. Petigru (1789–1863), American lawyer and politician
 Michael Pettigrew (born 1985), Australian rules footballer
 Peter Pettigrew (born 1950), Australian rules footballer
 Pierre Pettigrew (born 1951), Canadian politician
 Richard F. Pettigrew (1848–1926), American politician
 Samuel Pettigrew (died 1841), American politician
 Stanley Pettigrew (born 1927), Irish painter
 Thomas Pettigrew (1791–1865), English surgeon and Egyptologist
 Tom Pettigrew (born 1936), Scottish footballer
 William Pettigrew (politician) (1825–1906), mayor of Brisbane, Queensland, Australia and member of the Legislative Council of Queensland
 William Pettigrew (missionary), British Christian missionary
 Willie Pettigrew (born 1953), Scottish football player

Fictional characters
 Francis Pettigrew, a barrister-cum-sleuth invented by crime writer Cyril Hare
 Peter Pettigrew (character), a character in Harry Potter
 Oliver Pettigrew, assistant headmaster in the television series Whack-O!
 Sheriff "Muletrain" Pettigrew, a character from The Buford Files

Places

United States
 Pettigrew, Arkansas, an unincorporated community
 Pettigrew Barns, a two historic barns in Flandreau, South Dakota
 Pettigrew Home & Museum, a historic house museum in Sioux Falls, South Dakota
 Pettigrew House, a historic house in Palo Alto, California
 Pettigrew School, a historic school in Pettigrew, Arkansas
 Pettigrew State Park, a state park in North Carolina
 Pettigrew Wildlife Management Area, a protected area in Virginia

Elsewhere
 Pettigrew Green Arena, an indoor sports arena in Napier, Hawke's Bay
 Pettigrew Scarp, an escarpment on Annenkov Island in South Georgia and the South Sandwich Islands

English-language surnames